Go Karts, also known as Go!, is a 2019 Australian teen coming-of-age sports drama film directed by Owen Trevor on his feature film directorial debut. The film stars William Lodder, Frances O'Connor and Richard Roxburgh in the lead roles. It resembled similar to the storyline of 2010 Japanese martial arts drama film The Karate Kid. The film is based on kart racing community in the Western Australia and talks about an underdog winning the National Kart racing championship.

The film, originally titled Go!, premiered at the 2019 CinefestOZ Film Festival and was released to theatres on 16 January 2020 in Australia. Under the title Go Karts, the film was added to Netflix globally on 13 March 2020 excluding Australia and New Zealand and opened to mixed reviews from critics.

Plot 
Jack and his single mother Christie move into a small town in Western Australia. Jack relieves his painful memory as he lost his father Hooper from cancer.

Jack later helps his mum loading things into her new business shop. While helping his mum, she tells him to go to a party at a go kart track. He develops an interest, love and passion for go karting at the birthday party of his new friend, Mandy. Jack also discovers that he is really good at the sport and starts training but must learn to control his recklessness. He strives hard to win the Australian National Go Karts Championship by defeating the best drivers in Australia. He gets the support of his mentor Patrick and his best mates Colin and Mandy to achieve his dream. However he has to confront many obstacles to defeat the ruthless champion, Dean, who is his strongest competitor. Dean gets the support of his father, Mike, who owns a race team.

Cast 
 William Lodder as Jack Hooper
 Frances O'Connor as Christie Hooper, Jack's mother
 Adam T Perkin as Hooper, Jack's father
 Richard Roxburgh as Patrick
 Dan Wyllie as Barry, the local police officer. 
 Darius Amarfio-Jefferson as Colin
 Anastasia Bampos as Mandy Zeta
 Cooper van Grootel as Dean Zeta
 Damian de Montemas as Mike Zeta

Production 
The film marked debut directorial venture for Owen Trevor, who previously helmed short films. The film was made completely based on crowdfunding, funded by Screen Australia, Screenvest, Lotterywest, Spectrum Films, Create NSW, Media Super, Fulcrum Media Finance and the principal photography of the film commenced in Busselton in April 2018. In April 2018, the producers of the film advertised via online platforms to recruit required drivers, teams, officials and spectators for the shooting of the film. The film was entirely shot and set in Australia on the backdrop of kart racing sport. It was predominantly filmed in Western Australia especially in Perth and at few race tracks in the Western Australia such as Cockburn International Kartway, Bunbury City Kart Club. The official trailer of the film was unveiled by Roadshow Films on 22 August 2019 and the film was also premiered at the 2019 CinefestOz Film Festival.

American digital platform Netflix bought the worldwide rights of the film excluding Australia, New Zealand and unveiled its official trailer on 27 February 2020.

References

External links 
 
 

2019 films
Crowdfunded films
Australian auto racing films
Australian coming-of-age drama films
Australian sports drama films
English-language Netflix original films
2010s sports drama films
2019 drama films
Films set in Western Australia
Films shot in Australia
Kart racing
2010s English-language films
Screen Australia films
Roadshow Entertainment films